is a railway station on the Aonami Line in Nakamura-ku, Nagoya, Japan, operated by the third sector railway operator Nagoya Rinkai Rapid Transit.

History
Sasashima-raibu Station was built on the former site of Sasashima Freight Terminal, which sat at the junction between the Kansai Main Line and Tōkaidō Main Line. At its peak, the freight terminal handled the majority of cargo for the city of Nagoya. However, the freight terminal was closed and dismantled in 1986 in favor of the larger Nagoya Freight Terminal in Nakagawa-ku, near current-day Nakajima Station.

Sasashima-raibu Station was completed in 2004, along with the rest of the line. The station name was taken from Sasashima-raibu 24-ku, an urban renewal project where the former freight terminal stood. The station was completed in time to serve the Expo 2005, which had a satellite site in Sasashima-raibu 24-ku named "De･La･Fantasia".

Though Sasashima-raibu Station and Komeno Station are only 150 m apart, the two stations are divided by a wide set of train tracks and were not accessible through foot traffic. Therefore, a pedestrian overpass was built in 2011 that spans the tracks.

Station layout
The station consists of two elevated side platforms serving two tracks.

Platforms

Adjacent stations

Surrounding area

 Aichi University Nagoya Campus
 Zepp Nagoya

See also
 List of railway stations in Japan

References

External links

Railway stations in Nagoya
Railway stations opened in 2004
2004 establishments in Japan
Sasashima-chō